Csaba Szatmári (born 2 November 1973 in Debrecen) is a Hungarian football player who currently plays for Tiszaújváros.

In the 1996 Summer Olympics, he was a member of the Hungarian squad which was eliminated in the first round of the competition.

Despite a successful club career at Debrecen VSC, Szatmári never managed to feature in the national team since the 1996 Olympics.

External links
http://www.UEFA.com
https://web.archive.org/web/20021128052856/http://www.dvsc.hu/
http://www.eufo.de

1973 births
Living people
Sportspeople from Debrecen
Hungarian footballers
Hungary under-21 international footballers
Nemzeti Bajnokság I players
Debreceni VSC players
Nyíregyháza Spartacus FC players
Association football defenders